The women's 200 metre individual medley event at the 2018 Commonwealth Games was held on 8 April at the Gold Coast Aquatic Centre.

Records
Prior to this competition, the existing world, Commonwealth and Games records were as follows:

Results

Heats
The heats were held at 11:25.

Final
The final was held at 21:24.

References

Women's 200 metre individual medley
Commonwealth Games
Common